Svatava Kysilková (born 29 December 1964) is a Czech basketball player. She competed in the women's tournament at the 1988 Summer Olympics.

References

1964 births
Living people
Czech women's basketball players
Olympic basketball players of Czechoslovakia
Basketball players at the 1988 Summer Olympics
Sportspeople from Prague